Fast Freddie may refer to:

People nicknamed Fast Freddie
 Fred Lorenzen (born 1934), American former NASCAR driver
 Fred Rodriguez (born 1973), American road racing cyclist
 Jonathan Smith (wide receiver) (born 1981), American football player
 Freddie Spencer (born 1961), American former world champion motorcycle racer
Alfred Goulet (1944-2021), Street Drag Racer Ottawa, Ontario

Other uses
 Fast Freddie (video game), an arcade video game by Kaneko
 a title character of Fast Freddie, The Widow and Me, a 2011 UK Christmas special television programme

Lists of people by nickname